National Highway 45 (NH 45) is a primary national highway in India. This highway runs in the states,sagartola of Madhya Pradesh and Chhattisgarh. The route of NH-45 was extended from Jabalpur to Bilaspur in June 2016.

Route 

NH45 traverses the states of Madhya Pradesh and Chhattisgarh in India.
Madhya Pradesh
Obaidullaganj, Bareli, Tendukheda, Jabalpur, Kundam, Shahpura, Dindori, Sagartola, Kabir Chabutra - Chhattisgarh border

Chhattisgarh
M.P. border - Keonchi (Kionchi), Bilaspur

Junctions  
 
  Terminal near Obedullaganj.
  Interchange near village Paloha
  near Jabalpur
  near Jabalpur
  near Dindori
  near Bilaspur
  Terminal near Bilaspur.

See also 
 List of National Highways in India
 List of National Highways in India by state

References

External links 
 NH 45 on OpenStreetMap

National highways in India
National Highways in Madhya Pradesh
National Highways in Chhattisgarh